Thử Thách cùng bước nhảy: So You Think You Can Dance season 4 is the fourth season of the Vietnamese So You Think You Can Dance franchise. Chí Anh and Tuyết Minh return as judges on the show with fellow guest judge John Huy, Việt Max, Viết Thành etc. Trấn Thành hosts the show once again.

Auditions
Open auditions for season two were held in Hanoi and Ho Chi Minh City

HCMC week
The Ho Chi Minh City callbacks were held in Ho Chi Minh City.

Finals

Top 20 Finalists

Females

Males

Elimination Chart

Syndication

References

External links
The official site of SYTYCD VN
SYTYCD on Facebook page
SYTYCD on ZingMe page
YouTube channel of SYTYCD VN

Season 02
2010s Vietnamese television series
2015 Vietnamese television seasons